The Régiment d'infanterie chars de marine RICM in French, (R.I.C.M, or Marine Infantry Tank Regiment) is a light cavalry regiment of the French Army, successor to the Régiment d'infanterie coloniale du Maroc RICM (R.I.C.M, or Colonial Infantry Regiment of Morocco).

Created in June 1915, then designated accordingly in December 1958, by change of the infantry colonial regiment of Morocco, the regiment is part of the Troupes de Marine and is of a cavalry armoured specialty. The RICM is the most decorated regiment of the French Army. The regiment is attached to the 9th Marine Infantry Brigade 9e BIMa.

Creation and different nominations 

 In August 1914: creation of the 1st Mixed Colonial Infantry Regiment.
 In December 1914 : the regiment was designated as the 1st Marching Colonial Infantry Regiment.
 On June 9, 1915 : creation of the Colonial Infantry Regiment of Morocco. 
 In May 1956 : the regiment was redesignated as the Marine Infantry Tank Regiment.

History

World War I 

While the First World War was in its early weeks the regiment was raised in Morocco in the beginning of August 1914 under the designation of 1st Mixed Colonial Infantry Regiment. In December, the regiment was designated as 1st Marching Colonial Infantry Regiment. On August 17, 1914, the regiment disembarked and was accordingly engaged on the French front at the early beginning of the conflict. The RICM, Colonial Infantry Regiment of Morocco was officially created on June 9, 1915. The regiment was composed primarily of metropolitan Frenchmen, in accordance with the infantry of the French Marines. However, certain missions included Senegalese and Somali auxiliaries attached to the regiment.

Over four years, the regiment engaged on the various fronts as the most decorated regimental colors of the French Army with 10 citations at the orders of the armed forces.

In October 1916, the regiment was reinforced with Senegalese Tirailleurs and Somalis. The RICM reinforced by the 43rd Senegalese Tirailleurs battalion and two Somali companies, made their way through the trenches, piercing the lines a depth of two kilometers while undergoing counter-attacks and captured the Fort of Douaumont. For this occasion, the regiment was awarded the Légion d'honneur and the third citation at the orders of the armed forces.

Throughout the course of the war, the RICM endured the loss of 15000 Marsouins (killed or wounded) including 250 Officers. (Marsouin, 'porpoise', is the familiar nickname for French marine infantry.) The regimental colors would bear no less than 10 palms on the croix de guerre 14-18, the Légion d'honneur, the Médaille militaire (July 5, 1919) and the Order of the Tower and Sword.

The regiment garrisoned in Rhénanie from 1918 to 1925, after that, it returned to Morocco.

Interwar period 

The regiment was sent to Morocco, in the Rif first between 1925 and 1926, then from 1927 to 1932. During these years, 94 Marsouins were killed (out of which 8 Officers), 275 Marsouis wounded (out of which 7 Officers), as well as 10 disappeared.

During this period, the regiment was awarded the Military Sharifian Medal.

The 3rd battalion and the franc group of the RICM were awarded the Croix de guerre des théâtres d'opérations extérieures at the orders of the armed forces.

World War II 

In Charente on June 23, 1940, the RICM was still combat engaged at La Hayes-Descartes on June 24. Commanded by colonel Avre, the regiment had been engaged in battle for ten days and endured considerable losses when situated at the heights of Civray, south of Esvres. Two small detachments, commanded by lieutenant Setevenson, transmission officer, and captain Alfred Loudes, adjutant to the colonel, manoeuvered to defend the command post and succeeded. During these battles, the regiment endured 600 killed, wounded or disappeared during combat around Amboise.

During the armistice period, in the free zone, the 2e RIC garrisoned in Perpignan and the 21e RIC at Fréjus, Toulon and Marseille. The RICM was reconstituted in North Africa, as well as the 43e RIC.

Fall of 1943, the 9th Colonial Infantry Division 9e DIC was put in place by général Blaizot and the reconnaissance regiment of the Division was designated as the RICM of Rabat, during which at the end of April, the regiment embarked for Corsica. The division was of a solid formation. On June 17, 1944, the division occupied Elba. Two months later, the regiment disembarked in Provence at Nartelle, followed by the fall of Toulon and the regroup at Vierzon.

The RICM was the first to reach the Rhin, aspirant Jean-Louis Delayen raised the fanion of his squadron at Rosenau on November 20, 1944. End of November, the RICM made way to Mulhouse. The 9e DIC took 200 cities or villages, over a stretch of three hundred kilometers while facing five opposing divisions.

With the campaigns of the Liberation, the RICM endured the loss of 54 Marsouins (including 2 Officers), 143 wounded (including 6 officers).

Two citations, at the orders of the armed forces, decorated the regimental colors of the RICM.

A U.S. decoration, the Distinguished Unit was awarded to the regiment during battles in Belfort, Mulhouse and Seppois-le-Bas.

Indochina War 

On November 4, 1945, the first elements of the regiment arrived in Saigon. The regiment took part in all operations, including operation Gaur (1946), operation of control in Cochinchine and Annam (1946 to 1947), Cambodia (1946 to 1947), Tonkin (1946 to 1947), operation Lea (Lang-Son, Cao-Bang, Bac-Kan), high region (February 1948 to February 1951), operations in the delta (January 1948 to February 1951), Dien Bien Phu, and leading the last combats until July 1954. 

The Armoured Tonkin Group was decorated at the orders of the various armed forces. One squadron was decorated at orders of the French Navy, as well as the marching group squadron. A citation at the orders of the Army Corps was awarded to three squadrons (cited twice), the marching battalion of the RICM, the marching squadron group of the RICM as well as a platoon of one of the squadrons. One of the squadrons was awarded also a citation at the orders of the Division.

In total, 15 citations were awarded to units of the RICM during that war, 5 out of which were for the regiment.

During this war, the regiment endured the loss of 1300 Marsouins (out of which 57 Officers, 167 Sous-Officiers killed or wounded).

Algerian War 

In May 1956, the Colonial Infantry Regiment of Morocco made its way to Algeria. In 1958, while the Colonial Troops were rebranded Marine Troops, the initials were conserved in memory of its long history of service to France. The regiment became the Marine Infantry Tank Regiment, the only TDM (troupe de marine) formation to fight with light armour. In 1986, the 1st Marine Infantry Regiment 1er RIMa adopted a similar designation. Cadres of the regiment are formed at the Cavalry Application School of Saumur.

Following the ceasefire on March 19, 1962, 114 units of local forces of the Algerian order of battle were created in the whole of Algeria, composed of 10% French military personnel and 90% Muslim Algerian military personnel, who would remain in the service of the executive provisional power of Algeria until the independence of Algeria. The RICM formed the 513th unit of the local force of the Algerian order of battle during the transitory period to full independence (Accords d'Evian).

Return to metropole 

The regiment garrisoned at Vannes from 1963 to 1996, since September 1996, the regiment has been based in Poitiers.

Foreign Operations 

In 1978 and 1979, the RICM participated to operation Tacaud in Chad. In April 1978, 2 Marsouins were killed as well as several wounded during the battle of Salal, the first combat engagements during the conflict. In October of the same year, the regiment took part in the skirmish of "Forchana" followed by the combat engagement of "Katafa": where four military personnel were seriously wounded. During mid-December, the combat of Foundouck witnessed various personnel seriously wounded. At the beginning of 1979 on March 5, another assault was mounted, during which one Marsouin was killed and several were wounded. The outcome for the regiment was the apprehending of some 800 weapons and vehicles by the French groupment including units of the 3rd Marine Infantry Regiment 3e RIMa and the 11th Marine Artillery Regiment 11e RAMa. Accordingly, various platoons were detached in the capital in order to avoid any inter-ethnic confrontations. During these various combats, heavy losses were inflicted on rebels and a vast number of materials, arms and vehicles was recuperated or destroyed.

In parallel from March 1978 to September 1978, the 1st squadron was part of the first detachment of the United Nations Interim Force in Lebanon UNIFIL at the corps groupment of the 3rd Marine Infantry Parachute Regiment 3e RPIMa. One Marsouin was killed and several wounded during a combat engagement on May 2, 1978. A citation at the orders of the armed forces was awarded in October 1978 to the RICM for peace combat engagements in Lebanon, and Tchad in 1978. 
 
In end of 1979, the RICM took part in operation « Barracuda ». 
  
By a decision decree dated October 25, 1978, actions led by a regiment in a country linked to France by a cooperation accords (agreement) in the various fields and at the corps of the United Nations Interim Force in Lebanon was seen recompensated by attribution of an 18th citation at the orders of the armed forces.

In 1990 and 1991, the regiment intervened in operation Salamandre, then in the active phase of the Gulf War.

In 1992, the regiment contributed the first element of frenchbat (French battalion) of Sarajevo, from the RICM reinforced by a company of the 2nd Marine Infantry Regiment 2e RIMa in Ex-Yugoslavia, where the regiment endured the loss of 4 men and illustrated capability most notably during the combats of the Vrbanja bridge at Sarajevo on May 27, 1995.

In 1994, the regiment was engaged in operation Turquoise in Rwanda.

In 2004, the RICM led the tactical inter-arm group of operation Licorne in the Ivory Coast. The regiment endured the loss of five Marsouins and some thirty others wounded.

In 2019, it was announced that the RICM would deploy in the first trimester of 2021 to joint the ongoing Operation Barkhane in the African Sahel region, where the unit would be tasked with anti-terrorism, support, and civil affairs missions.

Organization 
The regiment is organized into 6 squadrons.

 Escadron de commandement et de logistique (ECL) - Command and Logistics Squadron
 1er Escadron de combat (1er Esc) - 1st Combat Squadron
 2e Escadron de combat (2e Esc) - 2nd Combat Squadron
 3e Escadron de combat (3e Esc) - 3rd Combat Squadron
 4e Escadron de combat (4e Esc) - 4th Combat Squadron
 Escadron de réserve (ER) - Reserve Squadron

Traditions

Motto 
Latin, "Recedit Immortalis Certamine Magno". In French : "Il revint Immortel de la Grande Bataille" which translates to : "Returned Immortal from the Grand Battle".

Insignias

Regimental Colors

Decorations 

The RICM is the most decorated regiment of the French Army. The regimental colors are decorated with:

 croix of the Légion d'honneur
 Médaille militaire
 croix de guerre 1914-1918 with:
 10 palms
 croix de guerre 1939-1945 with :
 2 palms
 Croix de guerre des théâtres d'opérations extérieures with:
 5 palms
 Cross for Military Valour with :
 1 palm, awarded retroactively on August 31, 2012, cited at the orders of the armed forces for service in 1978, Tchad (18th citation)
 1 palm, awarded retroactively on May 4, 2013, cited at the orders of the armed forces for service of the RICM in 2004, Ivory Coast (19th citation)
  (Order of the Tower and Sword - Portugal)
 Mérite Militaire Chérifien - Military Sharifian Medal
 Presidential Unit Citation with ROSENAU conferred January 10, 1957 by the United States.

The marsouins of the RICM bear wearing the Fourragere:

 The 2 Fourragere doubled with colors of the Légion d'honneur and the Croix de guerre (for 10 citations at the orders of the armed forces during the World War I), with olive bearing colors of the croix de guerre 1939-1945 (for 2 citations at the orders of the armed forces during World War II). 
 The Fourragere with colors of the Médaille militaire with olive bearing colors of the Croix de guerre des théâtres d'opérations extérieures (for citations at orders of the armed forces in exterior conflicts of theatres). 
  
The regimental colors of the RICM is the most decorated out of all regimental colors of the French Army. The regiment titled 19 citations at the orders of the armed forces in 2012.

Honors

Battle Honors 

 La Marne 1914-1918
 Verdun-Douaumont 1916
 La Malmaison 1917
 Plessis de Roye 1918)
 L'Aisne-L'Ailette 1918
 Champagne 1918
 Argonne 1918
 Maroc 1925-1926
 Toulon 1944
 Delle 1944
 Kehl 1945
 Indochine 1945-1954
 AFN 1952-1962

Regimental Commanders

Régiment d'infanterie coloniale du Maroc - R.I.C.M (1914 - 1958)

Régiment d'infanterie chars de marine - R.I.C.M (1958 - present) 

(*) Officer who later became général de corps d'armée.
(**) Officer who later became général d'armée.

Henri Bentégeat was Chef d'état-major des armées from 2002 to 2006.

Notable Officers & Marines 
 Joost van Vollenhoven (1877 - 1918), as a sergent, promoted sous-lieutenant at the beginning of the war, then as a captain at end of the war. Governor of French West Africa. Since 1963, the honorary hall of the regiment was baptized Joost van Vollenhoven. 
 général Jean-Louis Delayen (1921 - 2002), regimental commander of the 2nd Marine Infantry Regiment.

See also 
 Moroccan Division
 Marching Regiment of the Foreign Legion

References

Sources et bibliographies 

 Il revint immortel de la grande bataille", René Germain, 2007, éditions Italiques
 Dans la bataille ou la tempête : Jonques armées et vedettes fluviales du RICM. Auteur : Georges Ducrocq | Georges Goret | Michel Lesourd | Pierre de Tonquédec. Préface : M. le colonel François Labuze. Parution : 06/2009. Editeur : Lavauzelle, Panazol, France
 Erwan Bergot, La coloniale du Rif au Tchad 1925-1980, imprimé en France : décembre 1982, n° d'éditeur 7576, n° d'imprimeur 31129, sur les presses de l'imprimerie Hérissey.
 Aux rendez-vous de la gloire, conçu et réalisé par Philippe Cart-Tanneur avec des photographies de Patrick Garrouste
 Le Valet de cœur et la dame de pique, Lettre du monde, 1990, Jacques Duroyon

External links 

 
 Veterans' Association for the RICM
 Veteran from the 2nd Squadron of the RICM
 Joost van Vollenhoven#First World War

External links 

 
 Veterans' Association for the RICM
 Veteran from the 2nd Squadron of the RICM
 Joost van Vollenhoven#First World War

Marines regiments of France

Armoured regiments of France
20th-century regiments of France
21st-century regiments of France
Military units and formations established in 1915